Riordanvale is a rural locality in the Whitsunday Region, Queensland, Australia. In the  Riordanvale had a population of 312 people.

Geography
Dryander National Park occupies the north-west corner of the locality extending into neighbouring Gregory River to the west and neighbouring Woodwark to the north.

The land use is a mix of rural residential, grazing on native vegetation, and growing sugarcane.

History 
In the  Riordanvale had a population of 312 people.

References 

Whitsunday Region
Localities in Queensland